Boonea okamurai is a species of sea snail, a marine gastropod mollusk in the family Pyramidellidae, the pyrams and their allies. The species is one of eleven known species within the Boonea genus of gastropods.

Distribution
This marine species occurs throughout marine terrain within the Pacific Ocean off the east coasts of Japan.

References

External links
 To World Register of Marine Species

Pyramidellidae
Gastropods described in 1996